Denise Boucher (born December 12, 1935) is a Canadian writer living in Quebec.

Biography
The daughter of Alexandre Boucher, police chief, and Justine Bélair, she was born in Victoriaville, Quebec. She received a teaching certificate from the École normale Marguerite-Bourgeoys in Sherbrooke in 1953. She taught school in Victoriaville until 1961 when she began a career in journalism and broadcasting, moving to Montreal. She contributed to various newspapers and was a freelance journalist for Radio Canada. In 1978, she published the feminist work Cyprine: essai collage pour être une femme, which incorporates prose, poetry and quotations.

In 1978, her noted feminist play  was presented at the Théâtre du Nouveau Monde in Montreal. The play was met with strong opposition from the Catholic Church for its portrayal of the Virgin Mary. An English translation The Fairies are Thirsty was prepared by Alan Brown. Her play Les Divines was presented at the Théâtre d'Aujourd'hui in 1996.

Her musical review Gémeaux croisées toured Quebec and France to sold-out audiences, featuring performances by Pauline Julien and Anne Sylvestre respectively and directed by Viviane Théophilidès.

Her collections of poetry include Paris Polaroïd (1990) and Grandeur nature (1993). She has participated in numerous poetry festivals around the globe. 

Boucher has also written a rock opera Rose Ross (1983) and scripts for television and radio, as well as lyrics for popular songs for singers including Dan Bigras, Pauline Julien, Gerry Boulet, Chloé Sainte-Marie and Louise Forestier.

From 1998 to 2000, she was president of the Union des écrivaines et des écrivains québécois.

Awards and honours
In 2015, she was awarded the Prix Adagio.

References 

1935 births
Living people
Journalists from Quebec
Canadian women dramatists and playwrights
Canadian women poets
Canadian feminist writers
People from Victoriaville
Writers from Quebec